Joshua Andrew Clarkson (born 21 January 1997) is a New Zealand first-class cricketer who plays for Central Districts. In December 2015 he was named in New Zealand's squad for the 2016 Under-19 Cricket World Cup. He made his List A debut on 27 December 2015 in the 2015–16 Ford Trophy. Clarkson was educated at Nelson College from 2012 to 2014. In June 2018, he was awarded a contract with Central Districts for the 2018–19 season. On 27 December 2020, Clarkson played in his 50th Twenty20 match, during the 2020–21 Super Smash.

References

External links
 

1997 births
Living people
New Zealand cricketers
Central Districts cricketers
Cricketers from Christchurch
People educated at Nelson College